Events in the year 1805 in Norway.

Incumbents
Monarch: Christian VII

Events
It is believed to have been Norway's first railway.

Arts and literature

Births
8 January – Halvor Heyerdahl Rasch, zoologist (d.1883)

Full date unknown
Jørgen Wright Cappelen, bookseller and publisher (d.1878)
Bernt Sverdrup Maschmann, priest and politician (d.1869)
Ole Hersted Schjøtt, clergyman and politician (d.1848)
Jacob Staalesen Velde, politician

Deaths
21 April – Bernt Anker, merchant, chamberlain and playwright (born 1746).
Eistein Kjørn, woodcarver (born 1727).

See also

References